Melinda Copp (born July 7, 1962), later known by her married name Melinda Harrison, is a former competitive swimmer from Canada.  A native of London, Ontario, she attended the University of Michigan where she was the women's captain of the Michigan Wolverines swimming and diving team.  She swam the backstroke and individual medley for Michigan, won four Big Ten Conference championships.  She was also selected as an All-American swimmer in four events—the 100-yard backstroke, 400-yard individual medley, 200-yard individual medley, and as a member of the 400-yard medley relay team.

At the 1984 Summer Olympics in Los Angeles, she became the first Michigan Wolverines women's varsity swimmer to compete in the Olympics, representing Canada in the 200-meter backstroke.  She was inducted into the University of Michigan Athletic Hall of Honor in 2006; she was the first woman swimmer to receive the honor.

See also
University of Michigan Athletic Hall of Honor

References

External links
 Melinda Copp – Olympic athlete profile at Sports-Reference.com

1962 births
Living people
Canadian female backstroke swimmers
Canadian female medley swimmers
Michigan Wolverines women's swimmers
Olympic swimmers of Canada
Pan American Games competitors for Canada
Swimmers at the 1979 Pan American Games
Swimmers at the 1984 Summer Olympics
Swimmers from London, Ontario